Cantors Assembly (CA) is the international association of hazzanim (cantors) affiliated with Conservative Judaism. Cantors Assembly was founded in 1947 to develop the profession of the hazzan, to foster the fellowship and welfare of hazzanim, and to establish a conservatory for hazzanim.  The latter goal was realized in 1952 with the establishment of the Cantors Institute at the Jewish Theological Seminary of America. This Institute later developed into the H. L. Miller Cantorial School of the Jewish Theological Seminary of America.

Cantors Assembly first allowed women to join in 1990; women have been ordained as hazzanim in Conservative Judaism since 1987.

In 2013, Nancy Abramson became the first female president of Cantors Assembly.

In 2017, Alisa Pomerantz-Boro became the second female president of Cantors Assembly.

Cantors Assembly is the largest body of hazzanim in the world. Cantors Assembly's mission statement says that it serves its members and congregations while also helping "preserve and enhance the traditions of our people".

See also
Conservative Judaism
Rabbinical Assembly
Jewish Theological Seminary of America
Cantor in Reform Judaism

References

External links
 

Conservative Judaism in Ohio
Jewish charities based in the United States
Charities based in Ohio
Jewish music
Jewish organizations established in 1947